Stigmella pyrivora is a moth of the family Nepticulidae. It is endemic to Cyprus.

The larvae feed on Pyrus syriaca. They mine the leaves of their host plant. The mine resembles the mine of Stigmella paradoxa.

External links
Fauna Europaea
bladmineerders.nl

Nepticulidae
Moths of Europe
Moths described in 1981